Benken railway station is a railway station situated in the municipality of Benken in the Swiss canton of St. Gallen. It is located on the Rapperswil to Ziegelbrücke line.

The station is served by the hourly St. Gallen S-Bahn S6 service, which links Rapperswil with Schwanden via Uznach and Ziegelbrücke.

Services 
 the following services stop at Benken:

References

External links 
 
 

Railway stations in the canton of St. Gallen
Swiss Federal Railways stations